Revello (Arvel in  Piedmontese, Revel in Occitan) is a comune (municipality) in the Province of Cuneo in the Italian region Piedmont, located about  southwest of Turin and about  northwest of Cuneo.

Revello borders the following municipalities: Barge, Brondello, Cardè, Envie, Gambasca, Martiniana Po, Pagno, Rifreddo, and Saluzzo. In the frazione of San Firmino, on the Po River, is the eponymous church, built over an ancient Roman temple (of which parts of two columns remain).

History
Revello used to be a small city in the late middle ages of the former Marquisate of Saluzzo . It is found on a Courts register dating back to the tenth century. In this register it is called "Curtis Regia".

People
 Carlo Giovanni Maria Denina (1731-1813) was an Italian historian

Twin towns — sister cities
Revello is twinned with:
  Pozo del Molle, Argentina

References

External links
Official website

Cities and towns in Piedmont